Indiana Guard may refer to:

 Indiana National Guard, which is Indiana's organized-militia component of the US Army National Guard and Air National Guard
 Indiana Guard Reserve, which is the official organized militia of the state of Indiana, also known as the State Defense Force

See also
Militia (United States), organized and unorganized

Military in Indiana
Militia in the United States